1 Corinthians 14 is the fourteenth chapter of the First Epistle to the Corinthians in the New Testament of the Christian Bible. It is authored by Paul the Apostle and Sosthenes in Ephesus. In this chapter, Paul writes about the gift of prophesying and about speaking in tongues. Biblical scholar F. Dale Bruner states that "edification becomes the theme of this chapter: in Paul's thought, the ultimate criterion for a gift of the Spirit is this: Does it upbuild the church?"

Text 
The original text was written in Koine Greek. The chapter is divided into 40 verses.

Textual witnesses
Some early manuscripts containing the text of this chapter are:
Papyrus 46 (AD 175-225)
Codex Vaticanus (AD 325–350)
Codex Sinaiticus (330–360)
Papyrus 123 (4th century; extant verses 31–34)
Codex Alexandrinus (400–440)
Codex Freerianus (~450; extant verses 12–13, 22, 32–33)
Codex Claromontanus (~550)

Verse 2 
 "For he that speaketh in an unknown tongue speaketh not unto men, but unto God: for no man understandeth him; howbeit in the spirit he speaketh mysteries." – 1 Corinthians 14:2, King James Version
 "For he who speaks in a tongue does not speak to men but to God, for no one understands him; however, in the spirit he speaks mysteries." – 1 Corinthians 14:2, New King James Version
"In a tongue" (KJV: "in an unknown tongue"): some manuscripts and the Ethiopian version read "with tongues". Lightfoot assumes that it refers to the Hebrew language, which had become a dead language, and understood only by few people at that time, but nonetheless was used in the public prayers, preaching, and singing of psalms among the Jews. Paul states that the ministers, who had the gift of mastering this language (could read the Scriptures, preach, pray, and sung psalms in Hebrew), would not be helpful for non-Jews Christians, who do not understand it, so they should instead prophesy, pray, and sing in a language that can be understood. Otherwise, people may hear the sound, but cannot tell the meaning of it, and so it is of no use and advantage to them.
 "In the spirit he speaks mysteries": Under the influence and by the special gift of the Holy Spirit, a person is able to speak of 'the deep things of God, and the mysteries of his grace', but the meaning of his words could be unintelligible, without an understandable language.

Verse 21 
 Paul writes "In the law it is written": "With men of other tongues and other lips I will speak to this people; And yet, for all that, they will not hear Me". The quotation comes from the book of Isaiah, "but the term "the Law" was applied generally to the Old Testament".

Verse 29 
 Paul writes "Let two or three prophets speak, and let the others judge". This provided the basis of the protestant practice of Prophesying as practiced by European protestants during the sixteenth century.

Verses 34–35 
Verses 34–35 are widely believed to have been interpolated into the text by a later scribe:

Verses 34–35 are included in all extant manuscripts. Part of the reason for suspecting that this passage is an interpolation is that in several manuscripts in the Western tradition, it is placed at the end of chapter 14 instead of at its canonical location. This kind of variability is generally considered by textual critics to be a sign that a note, initially placed in the margins of the document, has been copied into the body of the text by a scribe. As E. Earle Ellis and Daniel B. Wallace note, however, a marginal note may well have been written by Paul himself. The loss of marginal arrows or other directional devices could explain why the scribe of the Western Vorlage placed it at the end of the chapter. The absence of an asterisk or obelisk in the margin of any manuscript – a common way of indicating doubt of authenticity – they argue, a strong argument that Paul wrote the passage and intended it in its traditional place. The passage has also been taken to contradict 11:5, where women are described as praying and prophesying in church. Alternatively, some scholars have argued that the passage is Paul's quotation of his Corinthian opponents, whom he has refuted by means of a negative rhetorical query directed toward the congregation in verse 36 following canonical order.  Advocates of this quotation/refutation hypothesis  explain the Western interpolation of the verses out of sequence (at the end of the chapter) as part of a scribal effort to shelter and defend these sentiments from the admonishment of Paul within the canonical verse order.

See also
Glossolalia
Related Bible parts: 1 Corinthians 12, 1 Corinthians 13

References

Further reading 
Becker, Eve-Marie. "An Exegetical Study of 1 Corinthians" 14: 33b-36.
Carson, D. A. Showing the Spirit : a theological exposition of 1 Corinthians 12-14. Grand Rapids, Mich. : Baker Book House, 1987. 
Gates, J. Terry. "A Historical Comparison of Public Singing by American Men and Women". Journal of Research in Music Education,  Vol. 37, No. 1 (Spring, 1989), pp. 32-47 
Hoehner, H.W. "The Purpose of Tongues in 1 Corinthians 14: 20-25"
Köstenberger, A. J. "Women in the Church", -   Evangelical Quarterly 2001
Schaibley, Robert. “Gender Considerations on the Pastoral Office: In Light of 1 Corinthians 14:33-36 and 1 Timothy 2:8-14.” Logia 3, no. 2 (Apr 1994): 45-51.

External links
Commentary on 1 Corinthians 14 by David Guzik
The Textual Problem of 1 Corinthians 14:34-35 by Daniel B. Wallace
Near-to-Greek-translation of 1 Cor 14. Interesting new thoughts for question of women ordination
1 Corinthians 14 Commentary by Albert Barnes
 King James Bible - Wikisource
English Translation with Parallel Latin Vulgate
Online Bible at GospelHall.org (ESV, KJV, Darby, American Standard Version, Bible in Basic English)
Multiple bible versions at Bible Gateway (NKJV, NIV, NRSV etc.)

14